Tybee National Wildlife Refuge was established on May 9, 1938, by an executive order of President Franklin D. Roosevelt, as a breeding area for migratory birds and other wildlife. Located in the mouth of the Savannah River, the  refuge began as a  oyster shoal, Oysterbed Island, used by the U.S. Army Corps of Engineers as a spoil disposal site to support their mandated harbor dredging activity. As a result, the majority of the refuge is now covered with sand deposits. The more stable portions of the island are densely covered with such woody species as eastern red cedar, wax myrtle, and groundsel. saltwater marsh  borders parts of the island.

The refuge is an important resting and feeding area for migratory birds including gulls, terns, neotropical migratory songbirds, and shorebirds. Least terns, black skimmers, Wilson's plovers, and several other shorebird species have nested on the spoil deposits on Tybee. During all seasons, the refuge's shoreline and open spoil deposits are used as resting sites for brown pelicans, gulls, and terns. Endangered species, including piping plovers and wood storks, have been observed on the refuge land, while shortnose sturgeon and manatees have been found in the waters bordering Tybee. With the use of telescopes, birdwatchers observe the refuge birdlife from levees located across the river within Fort Pulaski National Monument.

References
Refuge profile
Refuge website

National Wildlife Refuges in South Carolina
Protected areas of Jasper County, South Carolina
Protected areas established in 1938
Wetlands of South Carolina
Landforms of Jasper County, South Carolina